Justin Ammar (born March 25, 1988 in St. Albert, Alberta) is a Canadian professional soccer player.

Career

Europe
Ammar attended Paul Kane High School. After graduating, Justin Ammar joined the Canadian European Futbol Academy in an attempt to secure a professional playing contract in Europe. After attending trials, Ammar signed with German Fußball-Bayernliga team SV Heimstetten for 2009–2012 season. He made his professional debut on July 31, 2010, coming on as a substitute for starting keeper Patrick Lehner in a game against SpVgg Bayreuth. He went on to make 35 appearances for the club. Justin trained with the DFCA Futbol Academy (Deutsch Futbol Academy) and was named MVP. Justin played against high quality teams from the U20-German National team, Munich 1860, Bayern Munich's Second team, and the U20-Saudi Arabian team, The Vancouver Whitecaps and many more. Justin has 25 plus years of experience and has now launched his very own goalkeeper academy called Shot Stopper Academy, located in Guelph, Ontario, Canada.

North America
Ammar was called up by FC Edmonton of North American Soccer League on June 10, 2013 to provide goalkeeper cover for starter Lance Parker for their game against the Carolina RailHawks. Parker broke his arm in the 80th minute of the game, and Ammar came off the bench to make his debut for Edmonton. He kept a clean sheet in his 10 minutes in the game, although Edmonton lost the match 1-0.

NAIT OOKS 2014-2015: Justin Ammar was a member for the 2014-2015 NAIT OOKS. NAIT ended up going undefeated in the season and winning the State League championship and went off to nationals in Montreal and came out on top going undefeated and winning the Gold Medal.

AUSTRALIA

Justin Ammar flew over seas to Australia playing semi professional soccer for Joondalup City FC In the Western Australian State League finishing top 3 in the league.

References

External links
 Edmonton profile

1988 births
Living people
Canadian soccer players
FC Edmonton players
North American Soccer League players
Northern Alberta Institute of Technology alumni
Soccer people from Alberta
Sportspeople from St. Albert, Alberta
Association football goalkeepers
Canadian expatriate soccer players
Expatriate footballers in Germany
Canadian expatriate sportspeople in Germany
SV Heimstetten players